Casique is a surname. Notable people with the surname include:

 Joel Casique (1958–2010), Venezuelan artist
 Pedro Casique (born 2001), Peruvian footballer